Jan de Visser (born 1 January 1968 in the Netherlands) is a Dutch retired footballer.

Honours
Feyenoord
 Johan Cruyff Shield: 1999

References

Dutch footballers
Association football wingers
Association football midfielders
AZ Alkmaar players
SC Heerenveen players
Feyenoord players
UEFA Cup winning players
Living people
1968 births